Tanmay Mishra (born 22 December 1986 in Mumbai, India) is an Indian-born Kenyan former cricketer. A right-handed aggressive middle-order batsman, he made his One Day International debut for Kenya in 2006 against Zimbabwe at Bulawayo.

Early life 
Born in Mumbai, he moved to Kenya in 1994, at the age of 8.

Career 
In 2007, Tanmay enrolled himself in an Indian University, and this prevented him from making any appearances for the Kenyan national side for the next three years. He returned to the national team in 2010 October.

Mishra was bought by the Deccan Chargers ahead of IPL 5, he has been signed as an 'Indian' as he has an Indian passport (India does not allow dual citizenship). In the 2014 IPL players auction, he was bought by the Royal Challengers Bangalore for Rs. 10 lakhs.

In the domestic circle, he scored his first List A century in 2019, 13 years after he had played his first domestic one-day match. His ton came in Tripura's 2019–20 Vijay Hazare Trophy match against Madhya Pradesh.

He played in the 2011 Cricket World Cup, when in five matches he scored 133 runs. He was Kenya's second-highest scorer behind Collins Obuya. He made his highest ODI score of 72 in the match against Australia, when he and Obuya added 115 for the fourth wicket.

References

External links 

 
From playing World Cup for Kenya to piling runs for Tripura - Tanmay Mishra Story by Bastab K Parida

1986 births
Living people
Cricketers from Mumbai
Kenyan cricketers
Kenya One Day International cricketers
Kenya Twenty20 International cricketers
Cricketers at the 2007 Cricket World Cup
Cricketers at the 2011 Cricket World Cup
Indian cricketers
Indian emigrants to Kenya
Deccan Chargers cricketers
Royal Challengers Bangalore cricketers
Kenyan people of Indian descent
Indian expatriates in Kenya